Vallesia glabra, the pearlberry, is a species of plant, a shrub of the family Apocynaceae. It is native to tropical America. It also has the common names smooth vallesia and tear shrub.

Characteristics
This plant is a source of shelter, food and liquid for numerous birds, which rest under its shade and feed on its fruits that are similar to small, white grapes or pearls, hence giving the plant its English common name of pearlberry.

Growth
The shrubs can reach a height of between 2 and 6 metres (6 feet 6 inches and 19 feet 8 inches).

Distribution
This species is found in Mexico, Colombia, Ecuador (including the Galapagos Islands), Peru, Bolivia, Argentina, Paraguay, the Bahamas, Cuba and the United States (it is a native plant in Florida and has been introduced in California).

References

Hortipedia

External links

Rauvolfioideae
Taxa named by Antonio José Cavanilles